The 2019 PDC Nordic & Baltic ProTour consisted of 10 darts tournaments on the 2019 PDC Pro Tour.

Prize money
The prize money for each of the Nordic & Baltic ProTour events had a prize fund of €5,000.

This is how the prize money is divided:

February

Nordic & Baltic ProTour 1
ProTour 1 was contested on Saturday 2 February 2019 at the Apple Hotel & Konferens in Gothenburg, Sweden.

Nordic & Baltic ProTour 2
ProTour 2 was contested on Sunday 3 February 2019 at the Apple Hotel & Konferens in Gothenburg, Sweden.

March

Nordic & Baltic ProTour 3
ProTour 3 was contested on Saturday 9 March 2019 at the Slangerup Dart Club in Slangerup, Denmark.

Nordic & Baltic ProTour 4
ProTour 4 was contested on Sunday 10 March 2019 at the Slangerup Dart Club in Slangerup, Denmark.

August

Nordic & Baltic ProTour 5
ProTour 5 was contested on Saturday 24 August 2019 at Grænásbraut 606 in Keflavík, Iceland.

Nordic & Baltic ProTour 6
ProTour 6 was contested on Sunday 25 August 2019 at Grænásbraut 606 in Keflavík, Iceland.

October

Nordic & Baltic ProTour 7
ProTour 7 was contested on Saturday 12 October 2019 at Hotelli Tallukka in Vääksy, Finland.

Nordic & Baltic ProTour 8
ProTour 8 was contested on Sunday 13 October 2019 at Hotelli Tallukka in Vääksy, Finland.

November

Nordic & Baltic ProTour 9
ProTour 9 was contested on Saturday 2 November 2019 at Bellevue Park Hotel in Riga, Latvia.

Nordic & Baltic ProTour 10
ProTour 10 was contested on Sunday 3 November 2019 at Bellevue Park Hotel in Riga, Latvia.

References

2019 in darts
2019 PDC Pro Tour